Dipeptidyl peptidase is a type of enzyme classified under  EC 3.4.14.

Types include:
 Cathepsin C, dipeptidyl peptidase-1
 Dipeptidyl-peptidase II
 DPP3, dipeptidyl peptidase-3
 DPP4, Dipeptidyl peptidase-4
 DPP6, dipeptidyl peptidase-6
 DPP7, dipeptidyl peptidase-7
 DPP8, dipeptidyl peptidase-8
 DPP9, dipeptidyl peptidase-9
 DPP10, dipeptidyl peptidase-10

See also
 Tripeptidyl peptidase

References

Proteases